Mariano Caulín (born 22 May 1938) is a Uruguayan rower. He competed at the 1960 Summer Olympics and the 1964 Summer Olympics.

References

1938 births
Living people
Uruguayan male rowers
Olympic rowers of Uruguay
Rowers at the 1960 Summer Olympics
Rowers at the 1964 Summer Olympics
Sportspeople from Montevideo
Pan American Games medalists in rowing
Pan American Games gold medalists for Uruguay
Pan American Games silver medalists for Uruguay
Rowers at the 1959 Pan American Games
Rowers at the 1963 Pan American Games
20th-century Uruguayan people